Arnold Jackson may refer to:
 Arnold Jackson (British Army officer) (1891–1972), British athlete, British Army officer and barrister
 Arnold Jackson (character), a character on the television series Diff'rent Strokes, portrayed by Gary Coleman
 Arnold Jackson (cricketer) (1903–1971), English cricketer
 Arnold Jackson (American football) (born 1977), former American football player
 Arnold Jackson, a character in the cartoon series Totally Spies!